Yevgeny Kafelnikov and Andrei Olhovskiy were the defending champions but only Olhovskiy competed that year with Ken Flach.

Flach and Olhovskiy lost in the first round to Sébastien Leblanc and Jocelyn Robichaud.

Patrick Galbraith and Paul Haarhuis won in the final 7–6, 6–3 against Mark Knowles and Daniel Nestor.

Seeds
Champion seeds are indicated in bold text while text in italics indicates the round in which those seeds were eliminated. The top four seeded teams received byes into the second round.

Draw

Final

Top half

Bottom half

References
 1996 du Maurier Open Men's doubles draw

Doubles